Camilla Søeberg (born 9 June 1966) is a Danish actress.

Selected filmography
 Twist and Shout (1984)
 Manifesto (1988)
 The Empty Mirror (1996)
 Sekten (1997)
 Mouse Hunt (1997)
 The Reunion (2011)

References

External links

1966 births
Living people
Danish film actresses
Place of birth missing (living people)
20th-century Danish actresses